The Lower Austria Museum, formerly the Lower Austria State Museum (Landesmuseum Niederösterreich), is the national museum for the state of Lower Austria and covers the fields of history, art and nature. It is located in St. Pölten in Lower Austria.

Before it moved to St. Pölten in 2002, the museum, which was founded in 1902 by the Association for Cultural Studies, occupied several locations in Vienna. For example, in the period 1912-1923 it was based in Wallnerstraße and, from 1923 to 1997, it was housed in the Palais Mollard-Clary. On the establishment of the new state capital of St. Pölten, the state museum was transferred to the cultural region it represents.

Gallery

References

External links 

 www.museumnoe.at
  History database of the museum
 

Museums in Lower Austria
Zoos in Austria
History museums in Austria
Natural history museums in Austria
Museums established in 1903
1903 establishments in Austria